Nedeljko Čubrilović (born 5 April 1953) is a Bosnian Serb politician who was the 6th Speaker of the National Assembly of Republika Srpska from 2014 to 2022.

In 2000, he joined the Democratic People's Alliance (DNS). The DNS presidency dismissed Čubrilović as its vice president on 14 November 2018. Shortly after, he was elected as the 1st president of the newly established DEMOS on 22 December 2018 in Banja Luka.

Personal life
Nedeljko is married to Miloja Čubrilović and together they have a son named Đuro and a daughter named Mirjana. He lives and works in Banja Luka.

References

External links

Nedeljko Čubrilović at NSRS.net

1953 births
Living people
Serbs of Bosnia and Herzegovina
Academic staff of the University of Banja Luka
Speakers of the National Assembly of Republika Srpska